CPC Scientific is a biotechnology company that manufactures peptides. The company provides a number of products and services to academic researchers and pharmaceutical industries, including research- and GMP-grade custom peptides.

History
Headquartered in Sunnyvale, California, CPC Scientific was founded in 2001 by Dr. Shawn Lee, Ph.D. Product lines initially included research-grade custom peptides, catalog peptides, and Fmoc-protected amino acids. In 2006, CPC Scientific opened a GMP (Good Manufacturing Practice) facility in Hangzhou, China and began producing GMP-grade peptides for use in clinical applications. By 2011, the GMP facility was inspected by the U.S. Food and Drug Administration (FDA) and the company began supplying pharmaceutical-grade peptides to companies in the United States. On March 17, 2016, CPC Scientific passed a fourth U.S. FDA inspection.

Manufacturing
CPC Scientific manufactures most of their products by way of solid-phase peptide synthesis, a process originally described by Robert Bruce Merrifield in 1963. Solid-phase synthesis routes enable manufacturing of relatively long peptide sequences by avoiding isolation and purification of synthetic intermediates. This iterative process allows for the preparation of more complex peptides for use as active pharmaceutical ingredients (APIs), novel drug therapeutics, and general research applications. CPC Scientific has published some research articles that describe peptide synthesis methodologies, including a technique called hydrocarbon stapling. Stapled peptides contain a synthetic modification that involves olefin metathesis to stabilize alpha-helix and beta-sheet secondary structures. Products manufactured by CPC Scientific have also been cited in scientific journals.

References

External links

Biotechnology companies of the United States
Biotechnology companies established in 2001
Privately held companies based in California
Companies based in Sunnyvale, California
Technology companies based in the San Francisco Bay Area
2001 establishments in California